Horse Latitudes is an album by American singer/songwriter Jeffrey Foucault, released in 2011.

Reception

Writing for Allmusic, critic William Ruhlman wrote that "Singer/songwriter Jeffrey Foucault likes to play in a familiar, slow-moving country-folk style; this is a guy who has been to the desert on "A Horse with No Name," searching for a "Heart of Gold." The lyrical reflections he expresses so introspectively also tend to be spare and allusive... For the most part, however, Foucault is a miniaturist as interested in evoking mood as meaning in his atmospheric music, expecting his listeners to fill in the blanks." David Kleiner of Minor 7th wrote "Writers should check out Foucault's similes, here ("singing / darker than the sea") and throughout ("smoking like a river / in the dark before the dawn"), as the comparison is always unexpected and richer for it... What you remember is, "When I had one good coat, I was warm." You disappear. Only Foucault's songs remain, as haunting as they are haunted."

Track listing 
All songs by Jeffrey Foucault.
 "Horse Latitudes" – 5:20
 "Pretty Girl in a Small Town" – 2:32
 "Starlight and Static" – 3:31
 "Heart to the Husk" – 2:33
 "Last Night I Dreamed of Television" – 4:05
 "Goners Most" – 4:53
 "Everybody's Famous" – 4:37
 "Idaho" – 3:49
 "Passerines" – 4:33
 "Tea and Tobacco" – 2:46

Personnel
Jeffrey Foucault - vocals, acoustic guitar 
Kris Delmhorst - cello, fiddle
Jennifer Condos – bass
Billy Conway – drums
Eric Heywood – baritone guitar, electric guitar pedal steel
Van Dyke Parks – accordion, organ (Hammond), piano
Production notes:
 Jeffrey Foucault - producer
Alex McCollough – mastering
Justin Pizzoferrato – engineer
Pete Weiss – engineer
Ryan Freeland – engineer, mixing
Kris Delmhorst – photography
Matt Dellinger – liner notes
Renee Fernandez – design, layout

References

External links
 Official Jeffrey Foucault website
Signature Sounds Recordings

2011 albums
Jeffrey Foucault albums